School of Natural Philosophy is an 1837 scientific textbook by Richard Green Parker. It is credited with inspiring the inventor Thomas Edison.

External links
Parker's Natural And Experimental Philosophy (Electronic Historical Publications)

1837 books
Science books